Åsa M. Waldau (born October 26, 1965) is the former leader of a Christian sect in Knutby, Sweden, that disbanded in 2016. She is one of four sisters, the youngest of whom was the victim of the Knutby murder on January 10, 2004.

Biography
In 1985, Åsa Waldau had one month's theological training in a Pentecostal bible school in Stockholm. In 1990 Waldau (then Björk) was hired by the Pentecostal church in Uppsala as a children's pastor. However, because of her actions and because she divorced, she was forced to resign. She then moved to Knutby, where she  lived with the Waldau family, whose young son Patrik (born 1975) she had befriended in Uppsala. They married in June 1994.

Waldau was hired part-time by the Pentecostal congregation of Knutby in March 1992. Kim Wincent, whom she had met in bible school in 1985, was a pastor there. Waldau's authority over the congregants rapidly increased after she declared herself to be the "Bride of Christ" personified. There were claims of prophecies about a "disrespected servant of the Lord" who would be the cause of a "fire from Knutby." She traveled widely in Swedish Pentecostal communities, and induced many young people to move to Knutby. In 1997 she convinced Helge Fossmo and his wife Heléne to join the Knutby community as a pastor.

In 2020, Waldau and two pastors from the Knutby congregation were convicted of assault towards members of their church. Her sentence was conditional release, plus 120 hours of community service.

Teachings
The Philadelphia congregation in Knutby was established in 1921 during the Pentecostal revival in Sweden connected with Lewi Pethrus. Waldau was the granddaughter of Pethrus' successor Willis Säwe, but her mother did not raise her in the faith. She was born again, and entered the Pentecostal tradition, but she also underwent influences from Ulf Ekman and his Livets Ord movement and from Word of Faith.

The eschatology is pretribulationist. As the self-proclaimed "Bride of Christ," Waldau expected that she would be taken away before the Rapture, in a manner reminiscent of the dormition of the Virgin or the assumption of Mary, to be united with her Bridegroom.

Connection with the Knutby murder

In 2004, Helge Fossmo's nanny Sara Svensson confessed to having killed Fossmo's second wife Alexandra (Åsa Waldau's sister), under the influence of Fossmo. Fossmo had claimed to get text messages from God on his cellphone, which told him Svensson would not get mercy from God if she did not kill Alexandra and their neighbour Daniel Linde. Fossmo was having an affair with this neighbour's wife, Annette Linde, who was also Åsa Waldau's sister-in-law. At the same time Fossmo had an affair with Sara Svensson herself that he (and Waldau, allegedly) exploited to manipulate her into going forward with the assassination.

In 2004, Fossmo was arrested, prosecuted and sentenced to life in prison for conspiracy of murder and Svensson was sentenced to psychiatric care. Although Waldau was a close associate of Fossmo, there was null investigation or evidence linking her involvement to the murder plot and was never prosecuted -- at trial, prosecutor Anne Sjöblom maintained this 'close association' (and Waldau's self-anointed title 'the Bride of Christ') be withheld from the official record.

Celebrity
After the murders, Waldau continued to be very reclusive. She refused to be interviewed by newspapers and only appeared without speaking in the TV4 documentary A Fall from Grace. Her first appearance was at the trial in May 2004, speaking in court as a relative of her sister who had been murdered. She admitted that she had 'tested' whether she might be the Bride of Christ, an idea she attributed to Helge Fossmo.

In September 2004, Waldau was featured in a one-hour interview program on Sveriges Television by Stina Lundberg Dabrowski. The public's reaction was quite negative; Waldau came across as 'cold' and 'unfeeling'.

In March 2005, Waldau inspired the sect to open a spa. In November she released a music CD containing songs from the church of Knutby. In December she appeared on a discussion panel at the celebration of 175 year Aftonbladet, introduced there by Jan Guillou as Sweden's most maligned person in modern times.

In June 2006, the talk-show host Lennart Persson invited Waldau to his last installment of Debatt on national television, where she got into exchanges with Janne Josefsson and with Bert Karlsson. Bert Karlsson later that year invited her to his own program on the cable channel TV8. In October 2007 he published Waldau's autobiography, Kristi brud: vem kan man lita på? (English: Bride of Christ: whom can one trust?).

In April 2021, HBO Europe premiered Swedish-American docuseries, Pray, Obey, Kill, investigating the January 2004 Knutby murder. The series is primarily focused on Helge Fossmo and Åsa Waldau's involvement in the murder. Even though Waldau is featured in all six episodes, she declined to participate in the docuseries. Waldau remains a free woman and has changed her name.

References

Further reading

External links

Founders of new religious movements
1965 births
Living people
Swedish Pentecostal pastors
People from Örebro